Angelina Salter, 1859,  is a genus of ptychopariid trilobite belonging to the Family Olenidae, Suborder olenina. It lived during the Tremadocian Stage, lowermost of the two standard worldwide divisions forming the Lower Ordovician Series and lowest of the seven stages within the Ordovician System. It encompasses all rocks formed during Tremadocian times, which spanned the interval between 485.4 million and 477.7 million years ago. Fossilized remains of Angelina are known from Wales, Central and South America. It differs from most other Triarthrinae in being larger, with a relatively narrow glabella, the occipital ring poorly defined, and lateral glabellar furrows relatively obscure. Eyes are placed midlength that of the cephalon and the facial sutures converge on the front border at the midline. Species also have long genal spines. 

The type species, Angelina sedgwickii Salter, 1859, was named for the Revd. Adam Sedgwick, the 19th Century Cambridge geologist who coined the term "Cambrian". This is the classic trilobite species found at Y Garth Hill, near Porthmadog, North West Wales, and which has been collected for well over 100 years. This historic locality is described in Howells and Smith (1997)  and Rushton et al. (2000, p.111).  It lies in the Upper Mudstone Member of the Dol-cyn-afon Formation (formerly 'Angelina sedgwickii Beds' or 'Garth Hill Beds' of the Tremadoc slate.

Species 
 Angelina sedgwickii (Type species)
 Angelina hyeronimi
 Angelina kayseri
 Angelina punctolineata
 Angelina spinosa

Distribution 
Fossils of Angelina have been found in Argentina, Bolivia, Mexico,  North West Wales and Shropshire, England.

Gallery

References 

Olenina
Ptychopariida genera
Early Ordovician trilobites of Europe
Ordovician trilobites of North America
Ordovician Mexico
Ordovician trilobites of South America
Ordovician Argentina
Ordovician Bolivia